The Nokia E75 is a smartphone from the Eseries range with a side sliding QWERTY keyboard and also front keypad.

Features

Quad band GSM / GPRS / EDGE: GSM 850 / 900 / 1800 / 1900 
 Tri band UMTS / HSDPA UMTS 900 / 1900 / 2100 (E75-1) or UMTS 850 / 1900 / 2100 (E75-2)
 Integrated and Assisted GPS with TMC.
 Stereo FM radio 87.5-108 MHz with Visual Radio and RDS.
 3.2 megapixel camera with autofocus, 8x digital zoom, LED flash and geotagging support.
 Front-facing camera for video calls with MPEG-4.
 Self-portrait mirror.
 2.4 inch QVGA screen
 Modes: Define user preset standby screens for different times of the day.
 QWERTY sliding keyboard
 Numeric keypad
 WiFi 802.11b/g WLAN networking
 Bluetooth 2.0 with EDR
 High-Speed microUSB 2.0 support charging/data
 MicroSDHC
 N-Gage enabled
 Accelerometer for auto screen rotation.

Operating times
Talk time: Up to 4.2 hours (3G), 5.2 hours (GSM)
Standby time: Up to 11 days (3G), 12 days (GSM)
VoIP over WLAN: Up to 9 hours 
Music playback: Up to 25 hours

Bundled software

 Internet Radio
 Multiscanner
 WiPresenter
 Adv. Call Manager
 World Mate
 Adobe PDF
 Zip
 Dictionary
 Wireless Keyboard
 Barcode Reader
 Email for Nokia
 MfE (Mail for Exchange)
 Global Race – Raging Thunder
 Ovi Maps (turn-by-turn navigation one year)
 Nokia Sports Tracker

Digital TV 
With optional DVB-H (Digital Video Broadcasting for Handsets) Nokia Mobile TV Receiver SU-33W it is possible to watch television on the screen of the phone.

See also 
 Nokia Eseries
 Nokia 5730 XpressMusic (very similar to E75)
 List of Nokia products

References

External links 

 Nokia E75 product page
 Nokia E75 Full Phone Specification

Mobile phones introduced in 2009
Personal digital assistants
Mobile phones with an integrated hardware keyboard
S60 (software platform)
Devices capable of speech recognition
Nokia ESeries
Slider phones